Vologases (Parthian: Walagash, Middle Persian: Wardākhsh/Walākshsh, Balāsh), also known as Vologaeses, Vologaesus, Vologeses, Ologases, and Valarsh (Armenian), was the name of various ancient monarchs:

Kings of Parthia
 Vologases I c. 51–78
 Vologases II c. 77–80
 Vologases III c. 105–147
 Vologases IV c. 147–191
 Vologases V c. 191–208
 Vologases VI c. 208–228

Kings of Armenia
 Vologases I ruled 117/8–144
 Vologases II ruled 186–198
 Vologases III ruled 378-386 co-king with his brother Arsaces III

Others
 Vologases (chief) - chief of the Thracian Bessi, who led a revolt against the Romans in 13 BC
 A later Balash which belonged to the Sassanid dynasty
Vologases, King of Elymais, (c. 180- c. 190 AD)
Vologash, King of Hatra